Anomoeotes diaphana is a species of moth of the Anomoeotidae family. It is known from the Democratic Republic of the Congo.

References

Anomoeotidae
Insects of the Democratic Republic of the Congo
Moths of Africa
Endemic fauna of the Democratic Republic of the Congo
Moths described in 1932